Walter Shipley may refer to:
 Walter V. Shipley, American banker
 Walter Penn Shipley, American lawyer, chess player and chess organizer